Sheilla Tembalam Xego (born 1 August 1960) is a South African politician, educator and trade unionist from the Eastern Cape who has been a member of the National Assembly since 2011. Prior to entering parliament, she was a councillor of the Mbhashe Local Municipality from 2000 to 2006 and the Amathole District Municipality from 2006 to 2010. Xego is a member of the African National Congress.

Early life and career
Xego was born on 1 August 1960. She holds a diploma in education as well as a diploma in project management. In 1976 and 1977, she became interested in politics. She began teaching in 1980 and then joined a teacher's union.

A member of the African National Congress, Xhego was a councillor in the Mbhashe Local Municipality from 2000 to 2006, when she was elected to the Amathole District Municipality's council. She served as a councillor on the district council until 2010.

Parliamentary career
In 2011, Xego was sworn in as a member of the National Assembly. She was elected to a full term in the National Assembly in the 2014 general election held on 8 May. Xego then became a member of the  Portfolio Committee on Transport and the Portfolio Committee on Tourism in June 2014.

In August 2015, Xego voted for a report by the Minister of Police, Nathi Nhleko, that absolved President Jacob Zuma of paying any money towards the controversial multi-million rand upgrades at the Nkandla homestead, his private home in Nkandla, KwaZulu-Natal.

In the 2019 general election, Xego was re-elected for another term in parliament. She now serves on the Portfolio Committee on Communications and the Portfolio Committee on Tourism.

References

Living people
1960 births
Xhosa people
People from the Eastern Cape
African National Congress politicians
Members of the National Assembly of South Africa